Loxotoma seminigrens is a moth in the family Depressariidae. It was described by Edward Meyrick in 1932. It is found in Rio de Janeiro, Brazil.

References

Moths described in 1932
Stenomatinae
Moths of South America